Brian Ronald Peaker (born May 26, 1959 in London, Ontario) is a retired rower from Canada. He won the silver medal at the 1996 Summer Olympics in the Men's Lightweight Coxless Fours, alongside Jeffrey Lay, Dave Boyes, and Gavin Hassett.

References

1959 births
Canadian male rowers
Living people
Olympic medalists in rowing
Olympic rowers of Canada
Olympic silver medalists for Canada
Rowers at the 1996 Summer Olympics
Rowers from London, Ontario
Medalists at the 1996 Summer Olympics
Rowers at the 1986 Commonwealth Games
Commonwealth Games medallists in rowing
Commonwealth Games bronze medallists for Canada
Medallists at the 1986 Commonwealth Games